St Colmac's Church is a ruined 19th-century church in St Colmac, west of Ettrick Bay, on the Isle of Bute, Argyll and Bute, Scotland. Built in 1835, it is now a Category B listed structure, as are its kirkyard, boundary wall, gatepiers and gates.

Both properties are believed to have been built by John Paterson, a "very able builder and skilled mason" of Largs. They stand on the northern side of the B875 road, the church in a triangular plot of land with a minor road bounding it on its northern side.

Now gutted, the church's interior had an "unusual" arrangement, per photographs in the possession of the National Monuments Record of Scotland, with a full-length common communion table running east-to-west down the centre of the church, flanked by timber pews. West-facing box pews lined the side aisles. According to the handbook of the Scottish Vernacular Buildings Working Group, the communion table was made when required by converting pew ends.

Kirkyard
A Celtic cross that is often associated with a nearby Bronze Age stone circle is located in front of the church tower. A well-known tourist attraction, and often associated together, they were built several thousand years apart.

A modern, adjacent cemetery (North Bute Parish Churchyard) is located to the east of the 19th-century kirkyard.

Ruinous detail

References

Churches completed in 1835
Churches in Argyll and Bute
Listed churches in Scotland
Listed buildings in Argyll and Bute
1835 establishments in Scotland